Terry Alexandar Ejeh (born 31 October 1988) better known by his stage name Terry Apala, is a Nigerian afrobeat and Apala (traditional Yoruba music) hip-pop musician.

Background and early career
Terry Apala was born in  Lagos, Nigeria, to Jeff Ejeh, a banker and it was here that he first began his journey into entertainment at the age of 12. He was part of a dance group called  "Mezo Soprano" which went on to perform at the launch of "Kanu Heart Foundation" in 2000.

Solo career 
Terry left the group and decided to embark on a solo career. He released his debut mix trap "Champagne Shower" which launched him into the mainstream.

2017: Shape of You, Ed Sheeran cover
On 14 April 2017 he released  a cover of Ed Sheeran's single "Shape of You". The cover won him "Best Music Cover of the Year (International)" at the City People Music Award 2017. That same year, he was nominated for "Apala Artiste of the Year".
`
Terry was nominated Rookie of the Year at the 2016 The Headies Awards, and "Most Promising Act to Watch" at the 2016 Nigeria Entertainment Awards.

He was featured on Reminisce's 2016 song " Skit".

Major Vibes EP (2020) 
The self acclaimed King of Apala New Skool – Terry Apala releases his first music project titled "Major Vibes". "Major Vibes" is a six (6) track extended play (EP) that was released on 13 August and features no other artiste but was released with the collaboration of music producer/serial hit-maker, Major Bangz who produced all the tracks in the EP.

Singles

Awards and nominations

See also
 List of Nigerian musicians

References

External links

21st-century Nigerian male singers
1988 births
Living people
Nigerian hip hop singers
Nigerian music industry executives
Yoruba-language singers